Parartocarpus bracteata is a tree species in the family Moraceae.

References

bracteata